The Yeltsovka is a small river in Novosibirsk Oblast, Russia. Its length is 14 km (9 mi). It is a right tributary of the Ob, south of the city of Novosibirsk. The tributaries are the Romikha, Kamyshevka and Dol rivers.

Gallery

See also
 Izdrevaya River

References

External links
 "Hands off!": Residents of Nizhnyaya Yeltsovka staged a picket in front of the City Hall. NGS. «Руки прочь!»: жители Нижней Ельцовки устроили пикет напротив мэрии. НГС.

Rivers of Novosibirsk
Rivers of Novosibirsk Oblast
Sovetsky District, Novosibirsk